The Main Directorate for Public Order Maintenance of the Ministry of Internal Affairs of Russia is a structural unit of the central apparatus of the Ministry of Internal Affairs of Russia.

It carries out functions for the implementation of public policy in the field of public order and security and the organizational management of public security police units. It is the so-called “face” of the Russian police, since the employees of this particular unit are constantly visible in public places.

Structure and organisation 
 Patrol Service;
 Department of analysis and development of strategic decisions in ensuring the protection of public order;
 Department of organization and coordination of activities in the field of public order protection;
 Department of the organization of inquiry;
 Department of the licensing and permitting.

History 

Data on the protection of public order can be found in historical documents back in the days of Kievan Rus'. Under the orders of the princes, the Druzhina were engaged in the fight against crime on the territory of the principalities. To do this, they attracted free people - community members.

On April 30 (May 10), 1649, Tsar Alexis issued a decree “on urban deanery,” where, in addition to organizing fire brigade, the first regulatory framework for public order protection was enshrined: 

After the reforms of Peter the Great, the police were formed. A regular police force appeared in the cities, responsible for ordering the streets and other public places.

The reign of Alexander I can be considered a new era in the development of law enforcement services in Russia. On September 8 (20), 1802, he published a manifesto on the establishment of ministries, which included the Ministry of Internal Affairs. In 1804, by order of the Minister of the Interior, Viktor Kochubey, the external police was introduced. On July 3 (15), 1811, the Regulation on the Internal Guard was approved, the duties of which included: the capture of thieves, the prosecution and extermination of robbers, the pacification of disobedience and violence, the capture of fugitive criminals, and the maintenance of order at fairs and festivals. For the first time the concept of “police patrol service” is found in the Statute on the Metropolitan Police, approved in 1838. During this period, the number of police booths is increasing in many cities.

The main executive link in the police was the police station, led by the bailiff. He was subordinate to one officer and clerk. The site was divided into halves, led by near-warders, city guards and janitors. In 1917, after the October Revolution, the Ministry of Internal Affairs was liquidated along with the police.

On September 2, 1923, by order of the Central Administrative Department of the NKVD of the RSFSR No. 4, the “Instruction to the militiaman on guard” was approved, which sets out the general provisions on policing and the duties of a militiaman. In particular patrol policing and public order regulations were issued to ensure the militia would play a general role in protecting public order and safety within Russia. This date is today marked as the general anniversary of the Main Directorate for Public Order Maintenance.

References

External links 

 Главное управление по обеспечению охраны общественного порядка и координации взаимодействия с органами исполнительной власти субъектов Российской Федерации
 ГУОООП МВД РФ в Ъ-Справочнике.
Russian intelligence agencies
Ministry of Internal Affairs (Russia)
Ministry of Internal Affairs (Soviet Union)
Specialist law enforcement agencies of Russia